Jerry Houser (born July 14, 1952) is an American former actor. He is best known for his role as Oscar "Oscy" Seltzer in Summer of '42 and its sequel, Class of '44, as Dave "Killer" Carlson in Slap Shot, and the role of Wally Logan in various Brady Bunch spinoffs throughout the 1980s and '90s.

Early years
Houser was born in Los Angeles, and attended North Hollywood High School.

Career
From 1971 to 2006, he appeared in many films, TV series, animated series, and commercials. Some of his most notable appearances are Summer of '42, Slap Shot with Paul Newman, and in the Brady Bunch spin-off movies as Marcia's husband, Wally Logan.

On television, Houser portrayed Muff on We'll Get By, orderly Haskell on The New Temperatures Rising Show Steve on season 4 episode 21 of Maude (TV series) playing Maude's nephew and Jeremy Fenton on It Takes Two. He also provided the voices of Grizzle on Zazoo U, Sully on Danger Rangers,  and Bartholomew on The Gary Coleman Show.

Filmography 

 Bad Company — Arthur Simms
 Summer of '42 — Oscar "Oscy" Seltzer
 Class of '44 (1973 film)   — Oscar "Oscy" Seltzer
 Barnaby Jones — Monte
 The F.B.I. — Cliff Tetlow
 Seems Like Old Times — Gas Station Attendant
 Miracle on Ice — Les Auge
 Slap Shot — Dave "Killer" Carlson
 We'll Get By — Muff Platt
 M*A*S*H — Danker
 The Brady Brides — Wally Logan
 A Very Brady Christmas — Wally Logan
 The Bradys — Wally Logan
 McGee and Me! — Phillip "Phil" Monroe Sr.
 Magic — Taxi Driver
 S.O.S. Titanic — Daniel Marvin
 Years of the Beast — Gary Reed  
 Scooby-Doo Meets the Boo Brothers — Meako
 Nick & Noel — Nick
 Annabelle's Wish — Slim
 Charlotte's Web 2: Wilbur's Great Adventure — Mr. Zuckerman
 The Smurfs — Additional Voices
 The Biskitts — Shiner
 Transformers — Sandstorm
 G.I. Joe: A Real American Hero — Sci-Fi
 Goof Troop — Duke, Spud, Beast
 Disney's Aladdin — Additional voices
 I Yabba-Dabba Do! — Bamm-Bamm Rubble
 Hollyrock-a-Bye Baby — Bamm-Bamm Rubble
 Marvel: Ultimate Alliance — Hank Pym
 Darkness Before Dawn — Jellyfish
 Adventures in Odyssey — Ben Shepard and Jellyfish
 Secret Adventures — Mr. Toaster
 As Told by Ginger ― Principal Milty
 Danger Rangers — Sully (final role)

References

External links
 

1952 births
Living people
American male film actors
American male radio actors
American male television actors
American male voice actors
Male actors from Los Angeles